David Johansson (16 August 1926 – 24 September 2005), called Dalle, was a Swedish cross-country skier who won the 38th Vasaloppet ski race in 1961 in a new record time of 4 hours, 45 minutes and 10 seconds. After his own career, David Johansson coached the Swedish skier Thomas Magnusson.

References

External links
 - List of unique races in Vasaloppet (in Swedish)

Swedish male cross-country skiers
Vasaloppet winners
1926 births
2005 deaths